Agent 3S3: Massacre in the Sun (originally titled Agente 3S3, massacro al sole, also known as Agent 3S3: Hunter from the Unknown and Hunter from the Unknown) is a 1966 Italian adventure-eurospy film directed by Sergio Sollima, here credited as Simon Sterling. This is a sequel to Agent 3S3: Passport to Hell (1965) with Agent 3S3 once again played by George Ardisson. Orietta Berti, a popular Italian singer, sings in English the film's theme "Trouble galore". The two films were shot back to back.

This was filmed on locations in Berlin and Ibiza. It was coproduced by France, where it was released as Agent 3S3, massacre au soleil, and Spain, where is known as 3S3, agente especial and Agente 3S3 enviado especial.

Cast
George Ardisson 	as	 Walter Ross, Agent 3S3
Frank Wolff  	as	Ivan Tereczkov 
 Evi Marandi  	as	 Melissa   
 Michel Lemoine  	as		Radek 
 Fernando Sancho  	as		General Siqueiros 
 Luz Márquez 	as	Miss Barrientos 
 Eduardo Fajardo 	as	Professor Karlesten 
 Leontine May  	as	Josefa	 
 John Karlsen 	as	Tereczkov's Boss 
 Kitty Swan 	as	Night-club Singer (as Kersten Svanhold)
 Salvatore Borghese   
 María Granada

References

External links 
 

1966 films
1960s Italian-language films
Italian spy thriller films
1966 adventure films
1960s spy thriller films
Films directed by Sergio Sollima
Films scored by Piero Umiliani
Films shot in Berlin
Films shot in the Balearic Islands
Italian sequel films
1960s Italian films